Series 33 of Top Gear, a British motoring magazine and factual television programme. It was broadcast in the United Kingdom on BBC One and BBC One HD between 30 October 2022 and 18 December 2022. It was the seventh series to feature the presenting line-up of Chris Harris, Paddy McGuinness, and Freddie Flintoff, the fifth to be broadcast on BBC One, and the first series to be produced in Bristol.

Episodes

Notes

References

External links
 Series 33 at the Internet Movie Database
 Episode list
 BBC Media Centre series overview

2022 British television seasons
Top Gear seasons